The United States House of Representative elections of 1998 in North Carolina were held on 3 November 1998 as part of the biennial election to the United States House of Representatives.  All twelve seats in North Carolina, and 435 nationwide, were elected.

The Republicans won seven seats to the Democrats' five.  Eleven incumbents won re-election, while Democrat Bill Hefner's retirement in the 8th district allowed Republican Robin Hayes to enter the House for the first time.  The Libertarian Party ran in every district, almost quadrupling their total vote share, but their vote was smaller than the margin of victory in all races.

It is not to be confused with the election to the North Carolina House of Representatives, which was held on the same day.

Summary

Results

Footnotes

1998
United States House of Representatives
North Carolina